Trite is a genus of jumping spiders.

Trite may also refer to:

 Trite (coin), a historical currency used in Ancient Lydia
 "Trite", a song by Sage Francis from Sick of Waiting Tables (2001)
 Peter Trites (1946–2010), Canadian teacher and politician
 Roberta Seelinger Trites (born 1962), American professor English Literature

See also
 Cliché